This is a '''list of mayors of Woodstock, New Brunswick

See also
 List of people from New Brunswick

References
 
 

Woodstock